ProEvents is the leading football promoter in Asia and they are the marketing and event management consultancy with offices in Hong Kong, Malaysia and Singapore.

History 

The company was established in Hong Kong in 1992 by Paul J Kam and Julian Kam, a FIFA Licensed Match Agent. Subsequently, two more offices set up in Singapore and Malaysia in 2000 and 2001 respectively.

The company’s first ever international football match organised two decades ago was Hong Kong local champions Eastern Athletic Association vs. Japan J-League Nagoya Grampus Eight taken place at the Mongkok Stadium in Hong Kong in 1993. Since then, ProEvents has managed and organised international football matches in the following Asian cities:

Bandar Seri Begawan, Bangkok, Beijing, Busan, Guangzhou, Hangzhou, Hanoi, Hong Kong, Jakarta, Kuantan, Kuala Lumpur, Macao, Manila, Nagoya, Saitama, Seoul, Shanghai, Shenzhen, Singapore, Tokyo, Vancouver and Yiwu.

Business 

ProEvents has been organising and promoting international matches for major football clubs as well as national teams, also specialises in club sponsorship and CSR, media and event marketing, merchandising & licensing, player commercial endorsement and professional consultancy in football industry.

Clubs and National Teams 

Over the past 25 years, the company has organised and promoted international events with football clubs such as Arsenal, FC Barcelona, Chelsea, Inter Milan, Liverpool, Manchester City, Manchester United etc. Also national teams such as Argentina, Brazil, China, England, Japan, Malaysia, Thailand etc.
ProEvents have been appointed by the Premier League as Official Event Management Partner exclusively to organise the Barclays Asia Trophy in Hong Kong in 2011 and 2013.

Players 

The company has worked with a number of high-profile players for commercial endorsement in the region. These players include Lionel Messi, Frank Lampard, Fernando Torres, Fabio Cannavaro, Ahn Jung Hwan, Ryan Giggs, Michael Owen, John Terry, Steven Gerrard, Robert Pires.

Matches 

Updated at 16 Oct 2019

References

External links

Entertainment companies established in 1992